A bought out deal is a method of  offering securities to the public through a sponsor or underwriter (a bank, financial institution, or an individual). The securities are listed in one or more stock exchanges within a time frame mutually agreed upon by the company and the sponsor. This option saves the issuing company the costs and time involved in a public issue. The cost of holding the shares can be reimbursed by the company, or the sponsor can offer the shares to the public at a premium to earn profits. Terms are agreed upon by the company 

The Securities and Exchange Board of India mandates that only private companies can choose this method of issuing securities.

Features 
 Parties – There are three parties involved in a bought out deal; the promoters of the company, sponsors & co-sponsors who are generally merchant bankers and investors
 Outright sale – There is an outright sale of a chunk of equity shares to a single sponsor or a lead sponsor
 Syndicate – The sponsor forms a syndicate for management of resources required & distribution of risk
 Sale Price – The sale price is finalized through negotiations between the issuing company & the purchaser which is influenced by reputation of the promoters, project evaluation, prevailing market sentiment, prospects of off-loading these shares at a future date, etc.
 Fund base – The bought out deals are fund based activities where funds of merchant bankers get locked in for at least the prescribed minimum period.
 Listing – The listing generally takes place at a time when company is performing well in terms of profits & liquidity.

Advantages and disadvantages

Advantages 
 Speedy sale – The bought out deals offer a mechanism for speedy sale of securities involving lower issuing cost.
 Freedom – The bought out deals offer freedom for promoters to set a realistic price & negotiate the same with the sponsor.
 Investor protection – The bought out deals facilitates better investor protection as the sponsors are rigorously evaluated and appraised by the promoters before off-loading the issue
 Quality offer – The bought out deals help in improving the quality of capital flotation and primary market offering.

Disadvantages 
 Sponsors may take control of the company as they own large number of shares.
 When markets are down sponsors may incur losses.
 The risk of market manipulation by the sponsor such as insider trading is high.
 Sponsors can make large profits at the expense of small investors.

See also 
 Bought deal
 Private placement
 Underwriting contract
 Underwriter

References 

Securities (finance)